Phalaenopsis kapuasensis, also known as the Kapuas Hulu Phalaenopsis, is a species of orchid endemic to Borneo. The specific epithet kapuasensis refers to the indonesian locality Kapuas Hulu, from which the type specimen was obtained.

Description
These plants are pendent epiphytic herbs with cylindrical, green-silvery, textured, slightly flattened adventitious roots. The 4–5 cm long stem produces 3-6 pendent, green, oblong to oblong-elliptic, thick and succulent, waxy leaves, which are 22–48 cm long and 5–10 cm wide. Several pendulous, branched or unbranched inflorescences may be present on one individual. They are 10–34 cm long and may produce more than 30 flowers, of which 2-10 are open at the same time. The flowers are 2.6-3.0 cm wide, flat, greenish-yellow to pale yellow and the petals and sepals bear transverse, brown barring. The midlobe of the otherwise white labellum has purple longitudinal lines on the adaxial surface and pink suffusion on the abaxial surface.

Ecology
This species is found in lowland forests at elevations of 50–200 m above sea level.

Taxonomy
This species is a member of the species complex including three other endemic species of Borneo, specifically Phalaenopsis gigantea, Phalaenopsis doweryensis and Phalaenopsis rundumensis.

Differentiation from Phalaenopsis gigantea
This species has narrower leaves than Phalaenopsis gigantea. They are only up to 10 cm wide. The smaller flowers, which are only 26–30 mm wide, with narrower tepals are produced sequentially.
Phalaenopsis gigantea has broader leaves and flowers and the flowers may open simultaneously. In addition, the labellum of Phalaenopsis gigantea never has trichomes, unlike Phalaenopsis kapuasensis.

Differentiation from Phalaenopsis doweryensis
The midlobes of Phalaenopsis kapuasensis flowers do not have extensions on the upper lateral margins and they have trichomes on the upper surface of the labellum.
Flowers of Phalaenopsis doweryensis do have these extensions, while trichomes are absent.

Differentiation from Phalaenopsis rundumensis
Phalaenopsis kapuasensis has smaller flowers than Phalaenopsis rundumensis. They have oblong sidelobes. Trichomes are present on the upper sufrace of the labellum midlobe.
These features are not present in Phalaenopsis rundumensis flowers, which are larger and have triangular lateral lobes of the labellum. The labellum midlobe is hairless and the lateral margin is pappilose.

Conservation
Information on the distribution of epiphytic orchids, such as Phalaenopsis kapuasensis is currently insufficient. Steady poaching of wild populations for private gain occurs. Newly collected specimens are traded commercially, instead of being donated to botanic gardens. The precise location of observed populations are withheld from public knowledge, as a measure to protect them from illegal collection.
International trade is regulated through the CITES appendix II regulations of international trade.

References

kapuasensis
Orchids of Borneo
Orchids of Indonesia
Epiphytic orchids
Plants described in 2017